This is a list of singles that have peaked in the top 10 of the Billboard Hot 100 during 1965.

The Beatles and Herman's Hermits each had six top-ten hits in 1965, tying them for the most top-ten hits during the year.

Top-ten singles

1964 peaks

1966 peaks

See also
 1965 in music
 List of Hot 100 number-one singles of 1965 (U.S.)
 Billboard Year-End Hot 100 singles of 1965

References

General sources

Joel Whitburn Presents the Billboard Hot 100 Charts: The Sixties
Additional information obtained can be verified within Billboard's online archive services and print editions of the magazine.

1965
United States Hot 100 Top 10